Anthocleista scandens is a species of plant in the family Gentianaceae. It is found in Cameroon, Equatorial Guinea, Nigeria, and São Tomé and Príncipe. Its natural habitats are subtropical or tropical moist lowland forests and subtropical or tropical moist montane forests. It is threatened by habitat loss.

References

scandens
Flora of Cameroon
Flora of Equatorial Guinea
Flora of Nigeria
Flora of São Tomé Island
Flora of Príncipe
Taxonomy articles created by Polbot
Taxa named by Joseph Dalton Hooker
Plants described in 1861